Inquisition v. City of Charlotte was a landmark First Amendment Supreme Court decision.

The Inquisition  was an underground newspaper produced by East Mecklenburg High School students and their various contributors bi-monthly in Charlotte, North Carolina from April 1968 to late 1969.

Background

The Inquisition  was an underground newspaper produced by high school students—mostly attending East Mecklenburg High School—and their various friends bi-monthly in Charlotte, North Carolina from April 1968 to late 1969. Inquisition was the first Underground Press Syndicate member from the U.S. South and a member of Liberation News Service. Copies of Inquisition can be found in 15 university libraries.

After a first issue of only 81, the magazine went to 450 then doubled again by the third issue. By its final issues, the newspaper inspired emotional rejections by parents and became an underground icon for teens.

Inquisition reporters are rumored to have taped one of Jimi Hendrix's last concerts for issue #3.

Superior Court case
The paper was the subject of a landmark First Amendment case, "Inquisition vs City of Charlotte", pitting freedom of the press against a city zoning ordinance from March - May, 1969. The case, which was partially decided by placing the sound of the paper's small printer against the sound of a power mower, was found in favor of Inquisition.

Revisiting
Inquisition was revisited by way of an interview with two founders, Russell Schwarz and Lynwood Sawyer, with scholar Suzanne Sink and host Michael Collins on WFAE's Charlotte Talks on November 10, 2010, and rebroadcast on January 16, 2012.

Inquisition'''s story was featured in a retrospective on the year 1968 in Charlotte Magazine September 2013.

See also
 List of underground newspapers of the 1960s counterculture

 References 

 External links 
 Dunbar, Hanson. High School Organizing Has Its Faults: Former Underground Editor. Page 7. Daily Tar Heel. October 3, 1969.
 Holding in the North Carolina Collection at University of North Carolina - Chapel Hill
 Encyclopedia of Journalism By D. Charles Whitney, Christopher H. Sterling "Alternative and Underground Newspapers" Volume 1, Page 81.
 The Inquisition - Charlotte Talks. WFAE Radio. Recorded interview by Mike Collins with Inquisition'' editors Russell Schwarz and Lynwood Sawyer and researcher Suzanne Sink. November 10, 2010. Link includes audio, images of the paper, Sink's research paper on the zoning case and references to the Jimi Hendrix recordings.
 Sink, Suzanne. Fueling the Southern underground Movement, mss 434, Special Collections, J. Murrey Atkins Library, University of North Carolina at Charlotte
 Southern Underground Press: The Project to Archive and Rebuild the Communities of The Southern Underground Press (website)

Student newspapers published in North Carolina
Underground press
Student rights case law in the United States
United States Free Speech Clause case law
1969 in United States case law
High school newspapers published in the United States
1968 in education
Legal history of North Carolina